Perham is a city in Otter Tail County, Minnesota. The population was 3,512 at the time of the 2020 census.

History
Perham was platted in 1873, and named for Josiah Perham, first president of the Northern Pacific Railway. As the village grew in economic importance, the surrounding township was renamed Perham Township in 1877 and Perham was incorporated in 1881.

Geography

U.S. Route 10 and Minnesota State Highways 78 and 108 are three of the main routes in the community.

Demographics

2010 census
As of the census of 2010, there were 2,985 people, 1,304 households, and 722 families living in the city. The racial makeup of the city was 94.1% White, 1.1% African American, 0.5% Native American, 0.5% Asian, 0.1% Pacific Islander, 2.3% from other races, and 1.5% from two or more races. Hispanic or Latino of any race were 4.8% of the population.

There were 1,304 households, of which 27.3% had children under the age of 18 living with them, 38.9% were married couples living together, 11.9% had a female householder with no husband present, 4.6% had a male householder with no wife present, and 44.6% were non-families. 38.0% of all households were made up of individuals, and 19.4% had someone living alone who was 65 years of age or older. The average household size was 2.19 and the average family size was 2.89.

The median age in the city was 41.5 years. 22.6% of residents were under the age of 18; 9.2% were between the ages of 18 and 24; 22.1% were from 25 to 44; 22.7% were from 45 to 64; and 23.4% were 65 years of age or older. The gender makeup of the city was 46.5% male and 53.5% female.

2000 census
As of the census of 2000, there were 2,559 people, 1,104 households, and 642 families living in the city. The racial makeup of the city was 96.99% White, 0.35% African American, 1.02% Native American, 0.27% Asian, 0.66% from other races, and 0.70% from two or more races. Hispanic or Latino of any race were 1.13% of the population. 50.3% were of German and 14.8% Norwegian ancestry.

There were 1,104 households, out of which 29.3% had children under the age of 18 living with them, 45.5% were married couples living together, 8.9% had a female householder with no husband present, and 41.8% were non-families. 37.1% of all households were made up of individuals, and 20.7% had someone living alone who was 65 years of age or older. The average household size was 2.23 and the average family size was 2.95.

In the city, the population was spread out, with 25.1% under the age of 18, 6.9% from 18 to 24, 25.7% from 25 to 44, 17.6% from 45 to 64, and 24.7% who were 65 years of age or older. The median age was 40 years. For every 100 females, there were 87.9 males. For every 100 females age 18 and over, there were 82.9 males.

The median income for a household in the city was $28,397, while the median income for a family was $40,184. Males had a median income of $29,087 versus $20,817 for females. The per capita income for the city was $16,444. About 8.1% of families and 13.2% of the population were below the poverty line, including 15.3% of those under age 18 and 13.9% of those age 65 or over.

Radio stations
FM radio
92.5 KXKK 92.5 Hot Country
94.5 KDLB Adult Contemporary The Arrow 94.7
97.5 KDKK 97.5 Music of Your Life
99.5 KPRW Lakes 99.5
99.9 KVOX-FM Froggy 99.9
100.3 KXPM-LP Relevant Radio
102.3 KRCQ Real Country 102.3
107.9 KPFX 107.9 The Fox
97.9 KFNW Contemporary Christian Music Life 97.9 
AM radio
870 KPRM Classic Country News/Talk
1070 KSKK Country
1570 KAKK Oldies

Newspaper
The Perham Focus is based in Perham, Minnesota, serves Otter Tail County, Minnesota and surrounding areas with a print newspaper, an e-paper and online news.

Notable people
Colvin G. Butler, Presbyterian clergyman, farmer, and politician
Gabriele Grunewald, U.S. champion middle distance runner
Fritz Hanson, legendary Canadian Football League pioneer
John Anthony Kaiser, Roman Catholic priest
Roger Molander, government official and activist
Dean Simpson, businessman and politician
Ray Taylor, film director
Larry N. Vanderhoef, 5th chancellor of University of California-Davis

See also
Perham Municipal Airport

References

External links

City website
Perham Chamber of Commerce -- Business, Community, and Visitor Information site

Cities in Otter Tail County, Minnesota
Cities in Minnesota